Ida Bay is a rural locality in the local government area (LGA) of Huon Valley in the South-east LGA region of Tasmania. The 2016 census recorded a population of 9 for the state suburb of Ida Bay.

History 
Ida Bay is a confirmed locality.

Geography
Much of the northern boundary follows the shoreline of the waters of the Lune River estuary, known as Ida Bay, Hastings Bay and Southport.

Road infrastructure 
Route C636 (Line River Road) runs through from north-west to south-west.

See also
 Ida Bay Railway

References

Towns in Tasmania
Localities of Huon Valley Council